In aeronautics and marine hydrodynamics, the advance ratio is the ratio of the freestream fluid speed to the propeller, rotor, or cyclorotor tip speed. When a propeller-driven vehicle is moving at high speed relative to the fluid, or the propeller is rotating slowly, the advance ratio of its propeller(s) is a high number; and when it is moving at low speed, or the propeller is rotating at high speed, the advance ratio is a low number.  The advance ratio is a useful non-dimensional velocity in helicopter and propeller theory, since propellers and rotors will experience the same angle of attack on every blade airfoil section at the same advance ratio regardless of actual forward speed. It is the inverse of the tip speed ratio used for wind turbines.

Mathematical definition

Propellers
The advance ratio J is a non-dimensional term given by:

where 
{| border="0"
|-
| Va          || is the freestream fluid velocity in m/s, typically the true airspeed of the aircraft or the water speed of the vessel
|-
| n || is the rotational speed of the propeller in revolutions per second
|-
| D          || is the propeller's diameter in m
|}

Helicopter rotors and cyclorotors
The advance ratio μ is defined as:

where 
{| border="0"
|-
| V∞          || is the free-stream fluid velocity in m/s, typically the true airspeed of the helicopter
|-
| Ω || is the rotor rotational speed in 

|-
| r          || is the rotor radius in m
|}

Significance

Helicopters
Single rotor helicopters are limited in forward speed by a combination of sonic tip speed and retreating blade stall. As the advance ratio increases, the relative velocity experienced by the retreating blade decreases so that the tip of the blade experiences zero velocity at an advance ratio of one. Helicopter rotors pitch the retreating blade to a higher angle of attack to maintain lift as the relative velocity decreases. At a sufficiently high advance ratio, the blade will reach the stalling angle of attack and experience retreating blade stall. Specially designed airfoils can increase the operating advance ratio by utilizing high lift coefficient airfoils. Currently, single rotor helicopters are practically limited to advance ratios less than 0.7.

Propellers
The advance ratio allow to calculate the performance of the propeller for any flight conditions. For a specific propeller geometry, charts can be used, providing the traction coefficient Kt and the torque coefficient Kq given as a function of the advance number J. These dimensionless numbers allows to calculate the actual thrust & torque of the propeller. These coefficients are experimentally determined for boat by: by so-called open water tests, usually performed in a cavitation tunnel or a towing tank.

The thrust can be calculated as: 

where
{| border="0"
|-
| T          || is the thrust of the propeller in N 
|-
|kt
|is the traction coefficient (dimensionless)
|-
| ρ || is the density of the fluid in kg/m³
|-
|n
|is the rotational speed in revolution per seconds
|-
| D          || is the propeller's diameter in m
|}

The torque can be calculated as: 

where
{|
|-
|Q          
| is the torque of the propeller in Nm 
|-
|kq
|is the torque coefficient (-)
|}

Relation to tip speed ratio
The advance ratio is the inverse of the tip speed ratio, used in wind turbine aerodynamics:
.

In operation, propellers and rotors are generally spinning, but could be immersed in a stationary fluid. Thus the tip speed is placed in the denominator so the advance ratio increases from zero to a positive non-infinite value as the velocity increases. Wind turbines use the reciprocal to prevent infinite values since they start stationary in a moving fluid.

See also
 Axial fan design
 Retreating blade stall
 Helicopter rotor
 Slowed rotor
 Aircraft propeller

Notes

External links
 Propeller Aircraft Performance and The Bootstrap Approach
 MIT Thermodynamics 11.7 Performance of propellers

Aerospace engineering